Tennessee is a state located in the Southern United States. There are 346 municipalities in the state of Tennessee.  Municipalities in the state are designated as "cities" or "towns". As of the 2010 U.S. Census, 3,564,494 Tennesseans, or just over 56% of the state's total population of 6,346,105, lived in municipalities. The remainder lived in unincorporated areas.

Municipal charters
Before 1954, all Tennessee municipalities were established by private act of the state legislature and operated under charters established by private act of the legislature. As of 2007, 212 of the state's municipalities were operating under charters established by private act of the legislature. In 1953, amendments to the Tennessee Constitution prohibited subsequent incorporations by private act and provided for several new forms of municipal charter. Fourteen cities, including Memphis, Knoxville, and Chattanooga, three of the state's four largest cities, are "home rule cities" organized under charters approved by referendum of the citizens. Home rule charters are authorized by Article XI, Section 9, of the Tennessee State Constitution, as amended in 1953. Other municipalities are incorporated under one of several standardized types of charter authorized by state statute:
 67 cities use a mayor-aldermanic charter under Tennessee Code Annotated (TCA) §6-1-101 et seq. Hendersonville is the largest city using this type of charter.
 49 cities use a uniform city manager-commission charter under TCA §6-18-101 et seq. Brentwood is the largest city operating with a uniform manager-commission charter.
 Two cities (Elizabethton and Union City) are incorporated under a modified city manager-council charter under TCA §6-30-101 et seq.
 Consolidated city-county governments exist in three places: Nashville and Davidson County, Lynchburg and Moore County, and Hartsville and Trousdale County. City-county government consolidation is authorized by the Tennessee Constitution as amended in 1953 and TCA Title 7.

Some Tennessee municipalities are called "cities" and others are called "towns." These terms do not have legal significance in Tennessee and are not related to population, date of establishment, or type of municipal charter.

Under current state law (TCA Title 6), a minimum of 1,500 residents are required to incorporate as a new municipality under the mayor-alderman or city manager-commission charter, and a minimum of 5,000 residents are required to incorporate under a modified city manager-council charter. In general, unincorporated areas within three miles of an existing municipality (within five miles if the municipality has a population of 100,000 or more) are not permitted to incorporate as new municipalities. Provisions for incorporation were less restrictive in the past. The capital of Tennessee is Nashville.

List of incorporated cities and towns

 A All but one of Tennessee's county seats are municipalities. The exception is Blountville, county seat of Sullivan County. B For municipalities located in more than one county, the primary county (according to U.S. Census) is listed first.

References

External links

 Tennessee Code Annotated (TCA)
 Constitution of the State of Tennessee
 Getting to Know and Maybe Love Your Municipal Charter'', by Sidney D. Hemsley, Municipal Technical Advisory Service, 1992, revised 2008.

 
Tennessee
 
 
 
Cities and towns
Tennessee